Ghineh is a municipality in the Keserwan District of the Keserwan-Jbeil Governorate in Lebanon. It is located 36 kilometers north of Beirut. Its average elevation is 950 meters above sea level and its total land area is 199 hectares. It was famous for its Roman and Byzantine antiquities. 
Ghineh's inhabitants are predominantly Maronite Christians.

References

Populated places in Keserwan District
Maronite Christian communities in Lebanon